Ishaq Sidi Ishaq is a Nigerian actor, director, film/theatre journalist, filmmaker, producer, and screenwriter who is a pioneer in the Hausa movie industry in Nigeria. He was appointed as the Kano State Government's Senior Special Assistant to the Executive Governor of Kano State on Creative Industries in May 2021.

References

External links
 

Living people
People from Kano
Nigerian film actors
Nigerian male film actors
Hausa-language mass media
Male actors in Hausa cinema
Actors in Hausa cinema
21st-century Nigerian actors
21st-century Nigerian male actors
Kannywood actors
Nigerian film producers
Nigerian film directors
People from Gombe State
20th-century births